Asemosyrphus is a genus of rat-tail maggot flies in the family Syrphidae. There are three described species in Asemosyrphus. They were formerly members of the genus Lejops.

Species
These three species belong to the genus Asemosyrphus:
 Asemosyrphus arquatus (Say, 1829)
 Asemosyrphus mexicanus (Macquart, 1842) (southern sickleleg)
 Asemosyrphus polygrammus (Loew, 1872) (common sickleleg)

References

External links

 

Eristalinae